The men's 200 metres event at the 1991 Pan American Games was held in Havana, Cuba with the final on 7 and 8 August.

Medalists

Results

Heats
Wind:Heat 1: +1.7 m/s, Heat 2: +0.4 m/s, Heat 3: +1.1 m/s

Final
Wind: +0.2 m/s

References

Athletics at the 1991 Pan American Games
1991